The 2016 Japanese Super Cup was held on 20 February 2016 between the 2015 J.League champions Sanfrecce Hiroshima and the 2015 Emperor's Cup winners Gamba Osaka. Between them these two sides had won the Super Cup for the past 3 seasons and in this match it was Sanfrecce who triumphed  3–1 to lift the title for the fourth time in their history following successes in 2008, 2013 and 2014. For Gamba, this game marked their fourth loss in six Super Cup appearances, with wins in 2007 and 2015 being offset by defeats in 2006, 2009, 2010 and now this year.

As for the game itself, after a goalless first half it was Sanfrecce who took the lead 7 minutes into the second through the experienced Hisato Satō. Pacy forward Takuma Asano made it 2–0 from the penalty spot 5 minutes later, however Gamba's leading scorer for the past 3 seasons, Takashi Usami, opened his account for the 2016 campaign in the 68th minute to give his side a foothold in the contest. That did not last long and Sanfrecce's new Nigerian signing Peter Utaka wrapped the match up for the men from Hiroshima with 17 minutes remaining.

Match

Statistics

References

Japanese Super Cup
Super
Sanfrecce Hiroshima matches
Gamba Osaka matches
Sport in Yokohama